Abdulaziz Mohammed Al-Yahri (born 26 June 1990) is a Qatari international footballer who plays for Al-Shahania as a winger.

External links

References

1990 births
Living people
Qatari footballers
Association football midfielders
Umm Salal SC players
Al Ahli SC (Doha) players
Al-Shahania SC players
Qatar Stars League players
Qatari Second Division players
Qatar international footballers